Dakota John Bacus (born April 2, 1991) is an American professional baseball pitcherwho is a free agent. He made his debut in Major League Baseball (MLB) with the Washington Nationals in 2020.

Career

Oakland Athletics
Drafted out of Indiana State University by the Oakland Athletics in the 2012 Major League Baseball draft's ninth round, Bacus pitched mostly as a starter for the Class-A Beloit Snappers in his first full professional season in 2013. Bacus gained some media notoriety for a recurring on-field stunt in 2013 with Beloit, in which he would dress in all-white and stand on the warning track with his back to the white outfield wall during home games. "The Whitewall Ninja" would remain on the field, even when balls were put in play into the outfield, until he was noticed and told to go back to the bullpen. The Athletics' minor league coordinator ultimately stepped in to put a stop to the gag.

Washington Nationals
Bacus was traded to the Washington Nationals for catcher Kurt Suzuki on August 23, 2013. In the Nationals system over the next few years, Bacus made slow progress, briefly reaching the Class-AAA Syracuse Chiefs, the Nationals' top minor league affiliate, in 2015. After an injury-marred 2016 season in which he didn't make it back to Class-AAA ball, Bacus considered retiring from professional baseball. In 2017, Bacus experienced a marked jump in performance, pitching to a 1.80 ERA out of the Class-A Advanced Potomac Nationals and Class-AA Harrisburg Senators bullpens. He was invited to pitch in the Arizona Fall League after the 2017 season, appearing with the Mesa Solar Sox. Bacus later told his hometown paper, The Rock Island Dispatch-Argus, that he had rediscovered what made baseball fun for him in 2017.

After spending the 2018 season with the Senators, Bacus was promoted in April 2019 to the Class-AAA Fresno Grizzlies, his first return to the level in nearly four years. He was named a Pacific Coast League All-Star in 2019, alongside teammate Yadiel Hernández. By late June 2019, Bacus was being mentioned as a candidate for a promotion to the Nationals' major league bullpen by media outlets covering Washington baseball.

Bacus did not end up contributing to the Nationals' championship season in 2019, playing out the year with the Grizzlies. He became a minor league free agent after the season's end. On February 12, 2020, Bacus re-signed with the Nationals on a minor league contract.

The Nationals promoted Bacus to the major leagues on August 14, 2020 and he made his major league debut that day against the Baltimore Orioles.

On March 28, 2021, Bacus was designated for assignment after Luis Avilán was added to the roster. On March 30, Bacus was outrighted to the minors. He elected free agency on November 7, 2021.

Pitching style
Bacus, a right-hander, throws a fastball in the low to mid-90s and offsets it with a breaking ball.

References

External links

1991 births
Living people
People from Moline, Illinois
baseball players from Illinois
Major League Baseball pitchers
Washington Nationals players
Indiana State Sycamores baseball players
Arizona League Athletics players
Beloit Snappers players
Hagerstown Suns players
Potomac Nationals players
Harrisburg Senators players
Syracuse Chiefs players
Fresno Grizzlies players
Salt River Rafters players
Mesa Solar Sox players
Rochester Red Wings players
Waterloo Bucks players